The name Earp may refer to:

People
 Frederick Earp (1841–1928), New Zealand goldminer and farmer
 Members of American Earp family:
 James Earp (1841–1926)
 Virgil Earp (1843–1905)
 Wyatt Earp (1848–1929)
 Morgan Earp (1851–1882)
 Warren Earp (1855–1900)
 British Earps:
 Thomas Earp (1828–1893), British Gothic Revival sculptor
 Thomas Earp (politician) (1830–1910), British Liberal Party politician
 John Earp (born 1860), English footballer
 Clifford Earp (1879–1921), British racing motorist

Culture
 Adaptations of Wyatt Earp's life:
 The Life and Legend of Wyatt Earp, U.S. television series, 1955–1961
 Wyatt Earp, 1994 film

Places
 Earp, California, US
 Wyatt Earp Islands, off the coast of Antarctica